Frederick Rudolph "Ted" Schroeder (July 20, 1921 – May 26, 2006) was an American tennis player who won the two most prestigious amateur tennis titles, Wimbledon and the U.S. National. He was the No. 1-ranked American amateur player in 1942; the No. 2 for 4 consecutive years, 1946 through 1949, and the latter year saw Schroeder ranked World No. 1 amateur by Pierre Gillou (president of the Fédération Française de Tennis).  He was born in Newark, New Jersey, but developed as a tennis player in Southern California under the guidance of Perry T. Jones.

Early life and career
Schroeder was born in Newark, NJ but moved to Glendale in his childhood where he learned to play tennis. He was discovered by Perry T. Jones who was based at the Los Angeles Tennis Club and mentored several world-class players including Ellsworth Vines, Bobby Riggs and Jack Kramer. Schroeder was an almost exact contemporary of Kramer, having been born only 10 days earlier in 1921, and they began to play against each other as top boy players in the mid-1930s.  Schroeder's career is similar to Kramer's in that they both became top players whose careers were then interrupted by World War II. They were also lifelong friends and at least once Schroeder mortgaged his house on short notice in order to be able to lend an unsolicited $25,000 to Kramer. Schroeder, however, attended college for four years, the first two at the University of Southern California (USC), and the last two at Stanford University. After the war Kramer proved himself to be slightly better than Schroeder in the amateur ranks and subsequently turned professional.

'Lucky Ted'
When Riggs semi-retired he became the promoter of the professional tour. He and Kramer decided that the only player who could oppose Kramer for a financially successful tour would be Schroeder. The youthful Pancho Gonzales was the reigning American amateur champion, due to his upset win at the U.S. Open Championships in 1948, but during his brief career had been beaten by Schroeder eight matches out of nine.  Schroeder, playing during vacation time from his job, won Wimbledon in June 1949, winning some tough matches along the way. Schroeder was two sets down against Gardnar Mulloy in round one and then had five-set wins against Frank Sedgman, Eric Sturgess and Jaroslav Drobny in the quarters, semis and final. According to his obituary in the New York Times, he "captivated London as an outgoing, straightforward Yank smoking a corn-cob pipe and earned the nickname 'Lucky Ted' there for his five-set escapes".

Professional hope
Following his Wimbledon victory, Riggs and Kramer offered Schroeder $25,000 to turn pro after he won the up-coming 1949 U.S. Championships and Schroeder accepted. But Gonzales upset their plans by beating the heavily favored Schroeder in a five-set final — it has been called the 11th greatest match of all time. Gonzales lost the 1-hour and 15-minute first set 16–18 but finally managed to prevail in the fifth set.  Kramer writes that in spite of his friendship with Schroeder, he has always felt that Schroeder subconsciously "tanked" the match, in order to avoid the rigors of the professional tour.  In any event, Gonzales was now the two-time American champion and Kramer and Riggs were obliged to sign him, instead of Schroeder, to a professional contract.

Post-war
Schroeder was never much more than a part-time player after the War, being preoccupied with his family and his career as vice president of a commercial refrigeration equipment company, and had never really intended to turn professional. Schroeder said he took his tennis far too emotionally to allow him to treat it as a profession. He remained a successful amateur player for a few more years and then faded from view.  He died in La Jolla, California at the age of 84. His son, John, is a professional golfer who has won on the PGA Tour. Had 2 others sons Richard Schroeder and Robert Schroeder.

Abilities
In his 1979 autobiography, the long-time tennis promoter and great player Jack Kramer included Schroeder in his list of the 21 greatest players of all time. Schroeder, says Kramer, "won with heart and stamina, but lacked in the simple mechanics."

Kramer writes,

Schroeder was inducted into the International Tennis Hall of Fame in Newport, Rhode Island in 1966.

Grand Slam finals

Singles (2 titles, 1 runner-up)

Men's doubles (3 titles, 3 runner-ups)

Mixed doubles (1 title)

References

Sources
 The Game, My 40 Years in Tennis (1979), Jack Kramer with Frank Deford
 Man with a Racket, The Autobiography of Pancho Gonzales, as Told to Cy Rice (1959)

External links
 
 
 
 

1921 births
2006 deaths
American male tennis players
Glendale High School (Glendale, California) alumni
Deaths from cancer in California
Sportspeople from Newark, New Jersey
Tennis players from San Diego
Stanford Cardinal men's tennis players
International Tennis Hall of Fame inductees
Tennis people from New Jersey
United States National champions (tennis)
USC Trojans men's tennis players
Wimbledon champions (pre-Open Era)
Grand Slam (tennis) champions in men's singles
Grand Slam (tennis) champions in mixed doubles
Grand Slam (tennis) champions in men's doubles
World number 1 ranked male tennis players